Filip Lazăr (6 May 1894 – 3 November 1936) was an avant-garde Romanian composer and pianist.

Life and career
Lazăr was born in Craiova, Romania and died in Paris, France. At the Bucharest Conservatory (1907–1912) he studied piano with Emilia Saegiu, theory with Dumitru Georgescu Kiriac and with Alfonso Castaldi he studied harmony, counterpoint and composition. He studied for two years with Castaldi at the Leipzig Conservatory before touring as a pianist, playing much new music. From 1928 he was in France and Switzerland. He ventured from a Romanian nationalistic style into serialism and neo-classicism.

From 1925, important publishers in Paris (Durand, Salabert, Max Eschig and Heugel) and Vienna (Universal Edition) began printing the works of Lazǎr and other Romanian composers such as Mihail Jora, Marcel Mihalovici and George Enescu.

In 1920 Lazăr was a founder-member of the Society of Romanian Composers. In 1932, along with Mihalovici, he was among the founders of the Triton society of contemporary music in Paris (1932–1939), and a member of its active committee.

Theatre music 

1918 – La bouteille de Panurge, ballet, libretto by André Cœuroy
1928 – Les Images de Béatrice, op. 18, opera from The Cenci by Percy Bysshe Shelley, libretto by André Cœuroy

Symphonic music 

1919 – Prelude, for orchestra
1921 – Romanian Suite in D, for orchestra
1924 – Divertissement on a simple theme, for orchestra
1925 – Suite Valaque, for small orchestra
1925 – "Gypsies", scherzo for full orchestra, played in Paris 1927, conducted by Serge Koussevitzky
1927 – Concerto Grosso, for orchestra, no. 1, op 17
1928 – Le Ring. Un round de 4 minutes, for orchestra no. 2 - a symphonic miniature inspired by a boxing match, played in Paris in 1930, conducted by George Georgescu
1931 – Musique pour Radio
1931 – Overture for small orchestra
1931 – Concerto No. 2, for piano and orchestra, op. 19
1934 – Concerto No. 3, for piano and orchestra, op. 23
1934 – Concerto No. 4, for percussion and 12 instruments, op. 24 – in 1935 premiered at the Triton concerts in Paris, conducted by Charles Munch, the next year played in Boston; Chamber concerto
1931 – Concerto Grosso No. 2, unfinished

Chamber music 

1915 – Sonata in F for piano
1919 – Sonata in E minor for violin and piano
1924 – Suite I for piano
1925 – Suite II for piano  Both suites played in Bucharest by Mme. Manya Botez.
1925 – Two Romanian folk dances for piano
1925 – Bagatelle for cello (or double bass) and piano (or orchestra)
1926 – Sonata III for piano
1927 – Bagatelle for piano
1929 – Sonata in A minor for piano, op. 15
1929 – Little pieces for children, op. 16
1934 – Trio for oboe, clarinet and bassoon
1935 – Trio for violin, viola and cello
1936 – Little suite for oboe, clarinet and bassoon; Trio for harps; Quintet for harps

Choral music 

1924 – "Dor de crâng", folk songs for mixed voices
1924 – "Paparudele", 6-part folk songs for mixed voices

Vocal music 

1926 – Two folk songs, for voice and piano ([Romanian] "Cuprinde: Mi-a trimis bădiţa dor"; "Dorule pribeag; Vai, mandruţo!")
1927 – Three pastorals, for voice and piano, lyrics by St. Octavian Iosif ([Romanian] "Cuprinde: Singurel ca un haiduc"; "Boii stau la jug supuşi"; "Dragă codule, te las!" )
Melody on a poem by Heinrich Heine for voice and piano 
Six melodies for voice and piano (or orchestra)

Biography 
 V. Tomescu, Filip Lazăr, Editura Muzicală, Bucureşti, 1963 [Romanian]

Notes

References
Modernity and the Avant-Garde in Romanian Music, 1920-1940

1894 births
1936 deaths
Romanian composers
Romanian classical pianists
People from Craiova
National University of Music Bucharest alumni
University of Music and Theatre Leipzig alumni
20th-century composers
20th-century classical pianists
Romanian emigrants to France